Mohamed Reda (born ) is an Egyptian male volleyball player. He is part of the Egypt men's national volleyball team and won the gold medal at the 2013 Islamic Solidarity Games. On club level he plays for Zamalek SC.

Sporting achievements

Clubs 
 Zamalek SC  :
 2 × Egyptian Volleyball League :2015/2016,2021/2022.
 3 × Egyptian Volleyball Cup : 2016/2017,2020/2021,2021/2022.

National team
  2 × Men's African Volleyball Championship : 2013-2015
  2 × Arab Games : 2014, 2016

Individually
 Best libero at 2021 Men's African Volleyball Championship
 Best receiver at 2018 African volleyball clubs championship
 Best libero at 2010 African volleyball championship junior team

References

 https://www.cavb.org/best-receiver-mohamed-reda-_resize/
 https://volleybox.net/mohamed-reda-p22576
 https://en.volleyballworld.com/en/volleyball/worldcup/2019/men/teams/egy-egypt/players/mohamed_hassan?id=77946

External links
 profile at FIVB.org

1993 births
Living people
Egyptian men's volleyball players
Place of birth missing (living people)